American garage rock band Osees have released twenty-six studio albums, two live albums, four compilation albums, eight extended plays (EPs), thirteen singles, and thirteen music videos.

Albums

Studio albums
Released as OCS
1 (2003)
2 (2004)
Songs About Death & Dying Vol. 3 (2005)
OCS 4: Get Stoved (2005)
Memory of a Cut Off Head (2017)

Released as The Oh Sees
The Cool Death of Island Raiders (2006)
Sucks Blood (2007)

Released as Thee Oh Sees
The Master's Bedroom Is Worth Spending a Night In (2008)
Help (2009)
Dog Poison (2009)
Warm Slime (2010)
Castlemania (2011)
Carrion Crawler/The Dream (2011)
Putrifiers II (2012)
Floating Coffin (2013)
Drop (2014)
Mutilator Defeated at Last (2015)
A Weird Exits (2016)
An Odd Entrances (2016)

Released as Oh Sees
 Orc (2017)
 Smote Reverser (2018)
 Face Stabber (2019)

Released as Osees
Protean Threat (2020)
Metamorphosed (2020)
Panther Rotate (2020)
Weirdo Hairdo (2021)
A Foul Form (2022)

Live albums
Thee Hounds of Foggy Notion (2008) Castle Face Records / Tomlab Records / Public Incorporated / CAPTCHA RECORDS (LP Version)
Live in San Francisco (2016) Castle Face Records
Live In San Francisco (2018) Rock Is Hell Records (as OCS)
Levitation Sessions (2020) The Orchard Music (in the name of The Reverberation Appreciation Society) (as Osees)
Live at Big Sur (2020) Castle Face Records / Spiritual Pajamas (LP Version) (as Osees)
Levitation Sessions II (2021) The Orchard Music (in the name of The Reverberation Appreciation Society) (as Osees)
 The Chapel, SF 10.2.19 (2021) Castle Face, Silver Current (as Oh Sees)

Compilation albums
Zork's Tape Bruise (Home Demos LP / Singles Collection CD), 2009, Kill Shaman Records / No Coast Records
Singles Collection: Vol 1 & 2, 2011, Castle Face Records
Putrifiers II Demos (Australian bonus CD / online release), 2012, Castle Face Records
Singles Collection Volume 3 (2013)

EPs
Live @ Yerba Buena Center for the Arts, 2005, Faux Fetus (online EP)
Grave Blockers EP, 2006, Rock Is Hell Records (6" lathe cut vinyl record and a 3" CDr, limited edition of 51)
Demos EP, 2007, Castle-Face (online iTunes/Amazon EP)
Peanut Butter Oven EP, 2008, Awesome Vistas
Split EP with The Intelligence, 2008, Mt. St. Mtn.
Quadrospazzed '09 (one sided 45rpm 12" record), 2010, Castle Face Records
Split EP with Total Control, 2011, Castle Face Records
Moon Sick, 2013, Castle Face Records

Singles

7-inch records
 Carol Ann / Bloody Water, 2008, Slowboy Records
 Tidal Wave / Heart Sweats, 2009, Woodsist Records
 Jay Reatard / Thee Oh Sees Tour Split, 2009, Shattered Records
 Thee Oh Sees / Ty Segall Split, 2009, Castle Face Records
 In the Shadow of the Giant (Sub Pop Singles Club 3.0), 2009, Sub Pop Records
 Blood In Your Ear / Friends Defined, 2009, Rock Is Hell Records
 Thee Oh Sees / Paul Cary Split, 2009, Stankhouse Records
 Grave Blockers EP, 2x7" reissue, 2010, Rock Is Hell Records
 Thee Oh Sees / Ty Segall Bruise Cruise, Vol. 1 Split, 2011, 453 Music
 Quintron / Thee Oh Sees Bruise Cruise Split, 2012, 453 Music
 Thee Oh Sees / The Mallard Split, LAMC Series Vol 3, 2012, Famous Class Records
 "There Is A Balm In Gilead", 2013, Castle Face Records - limited edition 
 "Fortress", 2016, Castle Face Records
 "Ticklish Warrior (Live In San Francisco)", 2016, Castle Face Records - limited edition 
 "Classic Bananas", 2016, Castle Face Records - limited edition
 "Dark Weald", 2020, Philthy Phonographic Records (7" lathe cut)

12-inch records
Dead Medic / A Few Days of Reflection, 2017, Castle Face Records
Clearly Invisible, 2018, Castle Face Records
The 12" Synth, 2019, Castle Face Records

Compilations appearances
This list generally excludes album tracks that have also appeared on compilations. As with the 7" singles, many of these tracks have subsequently been included on the band's Singles Collection series.

 You're Soaking in It, 1997, Load Records  ("Chinese Probe", same as "Intermission" from the album 2 as Oronoka Crash Suite)
 U.S. Pop Life Vol.11: Looking for the Perfect Glass - California Post Punk, 2001, Contact Records (as OCS)
 Love And Circuits, A Cardboard Records Compilation: From Aa to Zs, 2005, Cardboard Records
 The Worlds Lousy With Ideas 8, 2009, Almost Ready Records
 In A Cloud: New Sounds From San Francisco, 2010, Secret Seven Records ("Contraption" as Thee Oh Sees)
 Castle Face Group Flex, Vol. 1, 2011, Castle Face Records (Two covers, "Burning Spear" and "What You Need" as Thee Oh Sees)
 The Velvet Underground & Nico by Castle Face and Friends, 2012, Castle Face Records ("European Son" as Thee Oh Sees)
 The Wiener Dog Comp, 2012, Burger Records ("Teacher's Holiday" as Thee Oh Sees)
 Castle Face Group Flex II: Son of Flex, 2012, Castle Face Records ("Always Flying" as Thee Oh Sees)
 Live at Death By Audio 2012, 2013, Famous Class Records ("Lupine Dominus (Live)" as Thee Oh Sees) 
 Garage Swim, 2013, Adult Swim ("Devil Again" as Thee Oh Sees)
 The Wiener Dog Comp II, 2013, Burger Records ("On The Verge" as Thee Oh Sees)
 Coming Together for a Cure: Volume Two, 2013, Air House Records ("The Factory Reacts" as Thee Oh Sees)
 San Francisco Is Doomed, 2014, Crime On The Moon ("You Can Have It" as Thee Oh Sees) 
 50 Bands & A Cat for Indiana Equality, 2015, Joyful Noise Recordings ("The Ceiling" as Thee Oh Sees)
 Be Gay, Do Crime!, 2020, Girlsville ("Blood On Your Boots" as Osees)
 Warm 4 Winter Benefit Compilation, 2021, Folx ("Persuaders Up! Experiment" as Oh Sees)
 Dungeons & Dragons Spelljams, 2022, Kill Rock Stars ("Arena of Blood" as Osees)

Music videos
 "Block of Ice" (2008)
 "Meat Step Lively" (2009)
 "Chem-Farmer" (2011)
 "I Need Seed" (2011)
 "Lupine Dominus" (2012)
 "Minotaur" (2013)
 "Toe Cutter, Thumb Buster" (2013)
 "The Lens" (2014)
 "Drop" (2014) 
 "Dead Man's Gun" (2016)
 "Gelatinous Cube" (2017)
 "Nite Expo" (2017)
 "Drowned Beast" (2017)
 "Anthemic Aggressor" (2018)
 "Overthrown" (2018)
 "Abysmal Urn" (2018)
 "Enrique El Cobrador" (2018)
 "Poisoned Stones" (2019)
 "Heartworm" (2019)
 "Captain Loosely" (2019)
 "Together Tomorrow" (2019)
 "The Daily Heavy" (2019)
 "Snickersee" (2019)
 "Gholü" (2019)
 "Henchlock" (2019)
 "Red Study" (2020)
 "Scramble experiment" (2020)
 "Funeral Solution" (2022)
 “Perm Act” (2022)
 “A Foul Form” (2022)

References

Discographies of American artists
Rock music group discographies